In western classical music, the sonata cycle is a multi-movement structure used in a concerto, symphony or sonata.

In Music Theory
In the field of music theory, the term Sonata Cycle refers to the layout of a multi-movement work where the movements are recognizably in the forms of the tradition of classical music. It differs from the term cyclic form in that there is no unifying motive or theme used in all the movements. The standard sonata cycle has four movements, broken down as follows:

First Movement
The first movement is, by definition, written in sonata form, in a fast tempo (allegro), and in the home key of the overall piece. This movement can also be called the sonata-allegro.

Second Movement
The second movement is usually written in a slow tempo, in another key, and in one of a variety of forms such as theme and variations, compound ternary form, rondo, or sonata.

Third Movement
The third movement usually follows a dance-like form, such as Minuet [or Scherzo] and Trio form. It is commonly written in the home key.

Fourth Movement
The fourth movement is written in the home key, and may use rondo, sonata, or theme and variations form, among others.

For more detail see Sonata.

In Performance/Recording
In reference to performance or recording, Sonata Cycle almost always means the complete traversal of a set of works by a single composer. For example, a "Beethoven sonata cycle" would refer to a performer playing all of Beethoven's piano sonatas.

References

All of the musical terms above are in Wikipedia itself, and in The New Grove Dictionary of Music and Musicians, second edition, edited by Stanley Sadie and John Tyrrell. London: Macmillan Publishers. And in the online version Oxford Music Online. Although the latter website is by subscription, university and public libraries usually have a subscription to it.

Musical development
Musical form